The Tales of Wonder Keepers is a Russian 3D animated fantasy children's television series that is produced by Wizart Animation. The episodes take place after the events of the first film of The Snow Queen series. The serial explores the adventures of the characters Gerda, Kai and Luta. Wizart Animation adapts the familiar characters from the film series to the new format of animated television serials. For the first time the audience was introduced to a new major character named Icy.

After Gerda found Kai at the Arctics and the children return home, they accompany with them, Icy the mysterious daughter of the Snow Queen. However at home trouble arises. It is now up to the children as they turn into the superhero legion known as the Keepers of Wonders who must restore peace. Directed by Alexey Zamyslov, Andrey Korenkov and Aleksey Tsitsilin the series premiered on 25 October 2019. The series is currently broadcast in leading children's TV channels.

Plot 
Gerda and the charming weasel Luta rush to the aid of all those in need in their land. Gerda's pilgrimage from the Kingdom of Eternal Frost has ended as she safely brings home Kai. In the ordinary world, Icy has trouble adjusting her magical powers of frost. Gerda, Kai and Icy are transported into an ordinary world. However each of them wield extraordinary superpowers. Icy is able to freeze objects, Gerda has control over the North Wind, and Kai invents various kinds of mechanisms.

In the new world, Icy has opportunities to improve her socialization and balance her powers as they explore a world that suddenly turn into difficult situations. Gerda, Kai, Luta and Icy turn into superheroes at their headquarters as they become their community's justice league known as the Keepers of Wonders. Gerda becomes the guardian of the magic of the North Wind. Her special ability grants the ability to move object in the air. Icy will naturally use her frost powers.

A struggle of magic by the practitioners of Gerda and Icy collide with the practitioners of science by Harald, the megalomaniac genius inventor of the battle robot. Alfida, the leader of the pirates also pits against the Keepers of Wonders. Sometimes Gerda and Icy realize magic won't stop the villains. That is where their secret weapon, Luta the small but very brave weasel becomes their secret superhero point of attack. Even more beneficial will be the good inventions of Kai that compete against the inventions of Harald. Even though most of the inventions of Kai doesn't work they can be adapted for something else.

When little Icy disappears Gerda and Kai go to their headquarters and transform into Keepers of Wonders. They get acquainted with the fairy Florida and her magical garden. They learn Florida will try to use magic to create an army of plants and turn the planet into a botanical garden. Next time, the brave four help solve the mysterious theft of paintings from the royal gallery, because without it, little Icy will not be able to participate in the artist competition, where she was going to present her drawings. The characters use ingenuity to cope up with the dangers. Eventually they realize friendship, kindness and a little magic can truly make them into invincible super heroes.

Characters

Cast 
Gerda - (voiced by Tatiana Shitova (ru)) - the eponymous protagonist of the series, who will turn into a super hero girl at the headquarters. There she will transform into the legion of the Keeper of Wonders with a magical circular disk. Gerda is the wielder of the magic of the North Wind.

Kai - (voiced by Prokhor Chekhov (ru)) - a brave inventor who believes in the power of Science. Kai's good inventions such as a location-coordinate bow compete against the inventions of Harald.

Icy - (voiced by Tatiana Manetina) - five year old Icy, is the daughter of the Snow Queen. The young gifted inquisitive magician must adjust to a new world of ordinary life that is far different from where she used to live in the North. Through socialization skills with the Keepers of Wonders, Icy will have to balance her frost power abilities.

Alfida and Florida - (voiced by Inga Smetanina) - Alfida is a fearless pirate who leads her crew seeking treasure. Florida is the fairy of a botanical garden who has super powers over plants.

Harald - (voiced by Alexander Matveev) - inventor Harald is trying to gain power using a battle robot that runs on sunflower oil. The megalomaniac science genius who constantly invents all sorts of mechanisms most formidable weapon is a giant mechanical house. The mobile laboratory and fortress has destructive powers.

Nils and Troll - (voiced by Alexander Luchinin) - Nils runs a mill house while the Troll is a mysterious ice creature that activates in unforeseen times

Production 

Since 2017, Wizart Animation studio was looking at the prospects of the continuation of the international feature film series, The Snow Queen. They were aware of the growing subscriber demographic of the series that has reached seventeen million viewers in Russia and abroad. The creators of the films made an unambiguous decision – to launch the film into an animated series. The spin-off production will help their audience get acquainted with the series without them waiting for about two years that usually takes for a film to be finished. Created by Wizart series of Wizart Animation, the production will present a 52 x 11 minute, 3D animated TV serial that is targeted for children aged 6–9 years. The production will expand the familiar character's world to new areas.

The first footage was shown in the 2017 AFM. Directed by Alexey Zamyslov, Andrey Korenkov and Aleksey Tsitsilin the film is also consulted by animation director Shelley Page. The TV series is within the genres of comedy, fantasy and adventure. An acclaimed music department was ordered for the Snow Queen: Gerda and the Keepers of Wonders. Music was written by Brad Breeck of animated television series Gravity Falls.

Gabriel Hays, the composer of a number of animated television series will provide additional musical accompaniment. The composers were particularly inspired by the characters Icy: "She is very smart, quick-witted and never gives up finding herself in a difficult situation. We hope that Icy's unique way of solving problems and getting out of the most difficult situations will become a role model for other children." The composers were able to find the right melody that is a mixture of pop and folk similar to those used in Disney classics. In terms of animation, the studio tried to keep the quality at the same level as what was used in The Snow Queen films.

The film was slated to be finished by the fall of 2019. At the Cartoon Forum 2018 in Toulouse, the series was presented. The showcase at the International Animated Film Market (MIFA) in 2018 featured details on the series. The series was part of the exhibition at the MIPCOM-2018 presented by Aleksandra Modestova, General Director of Expocontent company. In June 2020, MIFA held online also featured the TV series. The series was presented in the world's first audiovisual online market of Russia, Key Buyers Event: Digital Edition. A preview of The Snow Queen series was held at 2019 festival Animatika in Artek, Russia. Director Andrey Korenkov organized the event where the participants were able to learn about animation.

In 2019 fall, Snow Queen: Gerda and the Keepers of Wonders was released. On City Day, 21 September 2019 the premiere was held at Voronezh. The first five episodes were shown. The event occurred in Voronezh because Wizart Animation has headquarters at the city. Vladimir Nikolaev, the producer of the series stated "The premiere of the new series in our hometown is especially significant for us. Viewers around the world know Wizart not just as a Russian company, but as an animation studio from Voronezh." In October 2019, Kidburg Interactive Museum in Voronezh hosted an animation workshop where children under the guidance of professional animators learn about how the animated series was made. In October 2019, only after three episodes the show was able to be viewed by 1.5 million viewers in the social network, VK. Daria Zhilkina, marketing manager at VKontakte says, "We are glad that the first to see the series was the users of the social network VK, where the consumption of animated content is steadily growing. The number of views suggests that the return of your favorite characters to the screens was perceived positively by the audience." In December 2019, Carousel broadcast the show.

The first four episodes of the series were part of special screenings in the New Year of 2019 in Moscow that was organized by the Moscow Department of Culture. In February 2020 the series crossed forty five million viewers in TV. In recognition for this event, manufacturer Simbat signed a master toy contract with Wizart for the distribution of dolls, character figures, board games of the series to the market. In 2020, Wizart Animation released inspirational backgrounds for Zoom based on the series.

The series is currently broadcast in the channels of STS Kids, Carousel and O!. The animation studio Wizart made a new mobile app "Guardians of Wonders: Snowballs." The arcade game available in AppStore and Google Play features a realistic snowball fight with trolls and the heroes of the series. On 27 June 2021, at the International TV Content Market MIP China, Wizart Animation revealed the series will be co-produced iQiyi studio. Considered one of the first Russian iQiyi Original, The Tales of Wonder Keepers will reach a wide audience. It is available in English and Mandarin with additional subtitles.

Themes 
The film presents main character Gerda along with the familiar cast of Kai, Alfida, Harald, Luta. However, the serial will show them in their child form. The creators of the film introduced a new character Icy, whom the series is completely centered around. Characterized as a little gifted girl with frost powers, each episode recounts how Icy along with the heroes overcome challenges and live in an ordinary world with magical abilities. The themes of socialization and friendship is explored in the film through the character Icy. The characters will be conceptualized with heroic qualities as they are transformed into super heroes known as Keepers of Wonders. The time frame for the series takes place just after the first film, The Snow Queen.

Episodes

Season 1 (2019) 
All episodes in this season were written by Dimitri Nesterak, Ilkham Abdel Khalek, Alina Dobrokvashina, Kristina Nebolcina, Alexander Petrenko, Kseniya Sibirko, Vera Sychkova, Julia Sheina, Nina Kosmileva, Kristina Ivanstova, Sibel Galina, Ekaterina Cuellar Rodriguez, Tatyana Skoropad, Semyon Astafyev, Anna Priymenko, Tatyana Kamshilina, Alexander Danchev, Natalya Sokolova, Karina Sabbina and Lyudmila Platonova.

TV channels and online platforms

Festivals and awards 
At the 18th Hiroshima International Animation Festival that premiered on 20 August 2020, the series was selected to be screened at the Animation for Children section. Chicago International Children's Film Festival as part of the Academy Awards recommendation juries will evaluate the series.

References

External links 
 
The Tales of Wonder Keepers on iQiyi

2010s animated television series
Russian children's animated adventure television series
Russian children's animated comedy television series
Russian computer-animated television series
Animated preschool education television series
2010s preschool education television series
2010s children's television series
2010s school television series
STS (TV channel) original programming
Animated television shows based on films
Animated television series about siblings
Animated television series about children
Superhero comedy television series
Television shows based on works by Hans Christian Andersen